Tyrone Morse Simmons (born July 5, 1949) is an American fencer. He competed in the team foil event at the 1972 Summer Olympics. He was born in Philadelphia, Pennsylvania.

References

External links
 

1949 births
Living people
American male foil fencers
Olympic fencers of the United States
Fencers at the 1972 Summer Olympics
Fencers from Philadelphia
Pan American Games medalists in fencing
Pan American Games gold medalists for the United States
Fencers at the 1971 Pan American Games